Seiridium is a genus of plant pathogens in the family Sporocadaceae.

The genus Lepteutypa is teleomorphic (reproducing sexually) and the corresponding anamorphic name, used to describe the asexual form, is Seiridium (formerly Coryneum). For instance, the name Seiridium cupressi is still be used for the anamorphic form of that species, but now that it is known that a sexual stage exists, the name Lepteutypa cupressi. On the other hand, no sexual stage of species Seiridium cardinale is known, so that is its only name.

Seiridium cardinale is important to gardeners and foresters as they cause the devastating Cyprus canker disease on Cupressus, Thuja, and related conifers in Northern Europe, America, Australia, and New Zealand. Seiridium cardinale is from California and was introduced to Europe around the 1930s, probably from infected nursery stock. A separate introduction affected the southern hemisphere.

Species
As accepted by Species Fungorum;

Seiridium abietinum 
Seiridium anceps 
Seiridium aquaticum 
Seiridium bignoniae 
Seiridium breviaristatum 
Seiridium caffrum 
Seiridium camelliae 
Seiridium canariense 
Seiridium cancrinum 
Seiridium cardinale 
Seiridium castaneae 
Seiridium ceratosporum 
Seiridium chinense 
Seiridium corni 
Seiridium cupressi 
Seiridium delleanii 
Seiridium embeliae 
Seiridium eriobotryae 
Seiridium eucalypti 
Seiridium indicum 
Seiridium intermedium 
Seiridium italicum 
Seiridium jefferisii 
Seiridium kartense 
Seiridium kenyanum 
Seiridium mali 
Seiridium marginatum 
Seiridium neocupressi 
Seiridium papillatum 
Seiridium persooniae 
Seiridium pezizoides 
Seiridium phylicae 
Seiridium podocarpi 
Seiridium proteae 
Seiridium pseudocardinale 
Seiridium rosarum 
Seiridium rostratum 
Seiridium spyridiicola 
Seiridium syzygii 
Seiridium tecomae 
Seiridium terebinthi 
Seiridium turgidum 
Seiridium venetum 
Seiridium viburni 

Former species;
 S. acerinum  = Sporocadus acerinus, Sporocadaceae
 S. banksiae  = Distononappendiculata banksiae, Sporocadaceae
 S. juniperi  = Pestalotia juniperi, Pestalotiopsidaceae
 S. liquidambaris  = Harknessia liquidambaris, Harknessiaceae
 S. unicorne  = Seiridium cupressi

References

Amphisphaeriales
Taxa named by Christian Gottfried Daniel Nees von Esenbeck
Taxa described in 1817